= 1872 Luxembourg general election =

Partial general elections were held in Luxembourg on 11 June 1872, electing members of the Chamber of Deputies. The elections took place in Echternach, Esch-sur-Alzette, Luxembourg-Campagne, Mersch, Remich, and Wiltz.

Under the election law at the time, any second-round run-off votes took place on the same day as the first round.

== Results ==
Candidates who were successful are in bold.

Canton	Seats	Candidate	First round	Second round
Canton	Seats	Candidate	Votes	Votes
Echternach		**Jean-Mathias Föhr (Note: Elected at the first round)**	217	
Echternach		**Bernard Servais**	187	
Echternach		**Michel Witry**	177	
Echternach		**Turnout**		
Esch-sur-Alzette		**De Wacquant**	426	
Esch-sur-Alzette		**Victor de Tornaco**	378	
Esch-sur-Alzette		**Wolff**	372	
Esch-sur-Alzette		**Brasseur**	334	
Esch-sur-Alzette		**Turnout**		
Luxembourg-Campagne	5	**Adolphe Fischer**	332	
Luxembourg-Campagne	5	**Charles Collart**	329	
Luxembourg-Campagne	5	**Klein**	289	
Luxembourg-Campagne	5	**De Lafontaine**	283	
Luxembourg-Campagne	5	Stifft	260	253
Luxembourg-Campagne	5	**Macher-Wurth (Note: Elected after a run-off round)**	256	279
Luxembourg-Campagne	5	Paul de Scherff	256	
Luxembourg-Campagne	5	Saur	248	
Luxembourg-Campagne	5	Bivort	245	
Luxembourg-Campagne	5	Wolff-Schweitzer	198	
Luxembourg-Campagne	5	**Turnout**	550	
Mersch		**Joseph Servais**	332	
Mersch		**Jean-Pierre-Nicolas Beschemont**	218	
Mersch		**J. Knaff**	189	
Mersch		J.-P. Fischer	123	
Mersch		Ruth	85	
Mersch		Erpelding	43	
Mersch		**Turnout**		
Remich		**Welter**	286	
Remich		**Jacques-Guillaume Lessel**	259	
Remich		**Gretsch**	156	
Remich		Würth	78	
Remich		**Turnout**		
Wiltz		**Paul Eyschen**	448	
Wiltz		**Mertens**	310	
Wiltz		**Jean-Joseph-Georges Faber-Knepper**	259	315
Wiltz		Pletschette	126	204
Wiltz		M. Servais	119	
Wiltz		Burggraff	109	
Wiltz		Schaack	99	
Wiltz		Greisch	33	
Wiltz		**Turnout**	529	
